Franswa Johannes Ueckermann (born 6 January 1994) is a South African professional rugby union player, who most recently played with the . His regular position is scrum-half.

Rugby career

2012–13: Youth rugby

In one of his two appearances, he scored a try against  in a 36–29 win.

He made nine appearances in Group B of the competition, scoring nine tries, making him the top scorer in the competition. Ueckermann helped them to a 29–24 win over SWD in the semi-finals, before scoring his ninth try of the competition in the final against ; however, it was not enough to help his side win silverware, with the team from Port Elizabeth winning 56–40.

2014–: Eastern Province Kings

For the 2014 season, Ueckermann moved to Port Elizabeth to join the Eastern Province. The team won all their matches in the regular season before seeing off  in the semi-final and SWD in the final, with Ueckermann starting both those matches to help them secure the title. He also started their promotion play-off match a week later, as Eastern Province won 64–9 against  to secure promotion to Group A.

Ueckermann returned for their 2015 season in Group A of the competition, starting eight of their matches. It was a disappointing season for the team, however, as they won just a single match in their first season at their new level, finishing bottom of the log.

Ueckermann was amongst a large contingent of youngsters that were included in the  squad for the 2016 Currie Cup qualification series.

References

South African rugby union players
Living people
1994 births
People from Krugersdorp
Rugby union scrum-halves
Eastern Province Elephants players
Rugby union players from Gauteng